The Syktyvkar Constituency (No.18) is a Russian legislative constituency in the Komi Republic. The constituency is the only one in Komi Republic, and occupies the whole of its territory. However, in 1993-1995 Komi had two constituencies but lost one of them due to population decline.

Members elected

Election results

1993

|-
! colspan=2 style="background-color:#E9E9E9;text-align:left;vertical-align:top;" |Candidate
! style="background-color:#E9E9E9;text-align:left;vertical-align:top;" |Party
! style="background-color:#E9E9E9;text-align:right;" |Votes
! style="background-color:#E9E9E9;text-align:right;" |%
|-
|style="background-color:"|
|align=left|Valery Maksimov
|align=left|Independent
|54,701
|32.01%
|-
|style="background-color:"|
|align=left|Valery Nesterov
|align=left|Independent
| -
|31.22%
|-
| colspan="5" style="background-color:#E9E9E9;"|
|- style="font-weight:bold"
| colspan="3" style="text-align:left;" | Total
| 170,865
| 100%
|-
| colspan="5" style="background-color:#E9E9E9;"|
|- style="font-weight:bold"
| colspan="4" |Source:
|
|}

|-
! colspan=2 style="background-color:#E9E9E9;text-align:left;vertical-align:top;" |Candidate
! style="background-color:#E9E9E9;text-align:left;vertical-align:top;" |Party
! style="background-color:#E9E9E9;text-align:right;" |Votes
! style="background-color:#E9E9E9;text-align:right;" |%
|-
|style="background-color:"|
|align=left|Nikolay Gen
|align=left|Independent
|45,124
|21.22%
|-
|style="background-color:#E98282"|
|align=left|Yekaterina Popova
|align=left|Women of Russia
| -
|20.79%
|-
| colspan="5" style="background-color:#E9E9E9;"|
|- style="font-weight:bold"
| colspan="3" style="text-align:left;" | Total
| 212,653
| 100%
|-
| colspan="5" style="background-color:#E9E9E9;"|
|- style="font-weight:bold"
| colspan="4" |Source:
|
|}

1995

|-
! colspan=2 style="background-color:#E9E9E9;text-align:left;vertical-align:top;" |Candidate
! style="background-color:#E9E9E9;text-align:left;vertical-align:top;" |Party
! style="background-color:#E9E9E9;text-align:right;" |Votes
! style="background-color:#E9E9E9;text-align:right;" |%
|-
|style="background-color:"|
|align=left|Rita Chistokhodova
|align=left|Independent
|109,408
|24.57%
|-
|style="background-color:#23238E"|
|align=left|Gennady Rassokhin
|align=left|Our Home – Russia
|97,487
|21.89%
|-
|style="background-color:#1C1A0D"|
|align=left|Mikhail Gluzman
|align=left|Forward, Russia!
|53,846
|12.09%
|-
|style="background-color:#DA2021"|
|align=left|Vera Skorobogatova
|align=left|Ivan Rybkin Bloc
|40,718
|9.14%
|-
|style="background-color:"|
|align=left|Sergey Borisov
|align=left|Independent
|38,595
|8.67%
|-
|style="background-color:"|
|align=left|Yevgeny Babusenko
|align=left|Independent
|37,102
|8.33%
|-
|style="background-color:#FFF22E"|
|align=left|Andrey Titarenko
|align=left|Beer Lovers Party
|8,411
|1.89%
|-
|style="background-color:#295EC4"|
|align=left|Vitaly Mikulinsky
|align=left|Party of Economic Freedom
|4,151
|0.93%
|-
|style="background-color:#000000"|
|colspan=2 |against all
|47,511
|10.67%
|-
| colspan="5" style="background-color:#E9E9E9;"|
|- style="font-weight:bold"
| colspan="3" style="text-align:left;" | Total
| 445,307
| 100%
|-
| colspan="5" style="background-color:#E9E9E9;"|
|- style="font-weight:bold"
| colspan="4" |Source:
|
|}

1999

|-
! colspan=2 style="background-color:#E9E9E9;text-align:left;vertical-align:top;" |Candidate
! style="background-color:#E9E9E9;text-align:left;vertical-align:top;" |Party
! style="background-color:#E9E9E9;text-align:right;" |Votes
! style="background-color:#E9E9E9;text-align:right;" |%
|-
|style="background-color:"|
|align=left|Valery Markov
|align=left|Independent
|116,243
|25.38%
|-
|style="background-color:"|
|align=left|Ivan Mokhnachuk
|align=left|Independent
|57,953
|12.66%
|-
|style="background-color:#E98282"|
|align=left|Valentina Kotelnikova
|align=left|Women of Russia
|55,859
|12.20%
|-
|style="background-color:"|
|align=left|Nikolay Moiseev
|align=left|Yabloko
|54,191
|11.83%
|-
|style="background-color:"|
|align=left|Aleksandr Amonariev
|align=left|Communist Party
|51,494
|11.24%
|-
|style="background-color:"|
|align=left|Vladimir Lushnikov
|align=left|Independent
|28,920
|6.32%
|-
|style="background-color:"|
|align=left|Mikhail Zhilin
|align=left|Independent
|15,393
|3.36%
|-
|style="background-color:"|
|align=left|Valery Prokhorov
|align=left|Independent
|9,544
|2.08%
|-
|style="background-color:#000000"|
|colspan=2 |against all
|59,866
|13.07%
|-
| colspan="5" style="background-color:#E9E9E9;"|
|- style="font-weight:bold"
| colspan="3" style="text-align:left;" | Total
| 457,929
| 100%
|-
| colspan="5" style="background-color:#E9E9E9;"|
|- style="font-weight:bold"
| colspan="4" |Source:
|
|}

2003

|-
! colspan=2 style="background-color:#E9E9E9;text-align:left;vertical-align:top;" |Candidate
! style="background-color:#E9E9E9;text-align:left;vertical-align:top;" |Party
! style="background-color:#E9E9E9;text-align:right;" |Votes
! style="background-color:#E9E9E9;text-align:right;" |%
|-
|style="background-color:"|
|align=left|Yury Spiridonov
|align=left|Independent
|108,832
|26.86%
|-
|style="background-color:"|
|align=left|Vikenty Kozlov
|align=left|Independent
|108,421
|26.76%
|-
|style="background-color:"|
|align=left|Leonid Musinov
|align=left|Communist Party
|30,419
|7.51%
|-
|style="background-color:#1042A5"|
|align=left|Aleksandra Bushueva
|align=left|Union of Right Forces
|28,112
|6.94%
|-
|style="background-color:"|
|align=left|Mikhail Avdeev
|align=left|Independent
|27,262
|6.73%
|-
|style="background-color:"|
|align=left|Yevgeny Neznanov
|align=left|Liberal Democratic Party
|11,570
|2.86%
|-
|style="background-color:"|
|align=left|Pavel Sobotyuk
|align=left|Creation
|4,244
|1.05%
|-
|style="background-color:#000000"|
|colspan=2 |against all
|77,756
|19.19%
|-
| colspan="5" style="background-color:#E9E9E9;"|
|- style="font-weight:bold"
| colspan="3" style="text-align:left;" | Total
| 405,527
| 100%
|-
| colspan="5" style="background-color:#E9E9E9;"|
|- style="font-weight:bold"
| colspan="4" |Source:
|
|}

2016

|-
! colspan=2 style="background-color:#E9E9E9;text-align:left;vertical-align:top;" |Candidate
! style="background-color:#E9E9E9;text-align:left;vertical-align:top;" |Party
! style="background-color:#E9E9E9;text-align:right;" |Votes
! style="background-color:#E9E9E9;text-align:right;" |%
|-
|style="background-color:"|
|align=left|Ivan Medvedev
|align=left|United Russia
|103,296
|36.91%
|-
|style="background-color:"|
|align=left|Tatyana Saladina
|align=left|A Just Russia
|49,496
|17.69%
|-
|style="background-color:"|
|align=left|Ivan Filipchenko
|align=left|Liberal Democratic Party
|43,914
|15.69%
|-
|style="background-color:"|
|align=left|Oleg Mikhailov
|align=left|Communist Party
|36,463
|13.03%
|-
|style="background:"|
|align=left|Leonid Litvak
|align=left|Communists of Russia
|26,820
|9.58%
|-
| colspan="5" style="background-color:#E9E9E9;"|
|- style="font-weight:bold"
| colspan="3" style="text-align:left;" | Total
| 279,834
| 100%
|-
| colspan="5" style="background-color:#E9E9E9;"|
|- style="font-weight:bold"
| colspan="4" |Source:
|
|}

2021

|-
! colspan=2 style="background-color:#E9E9E9;text-align:left;vertical-align:top;" |Candidate
! style="background-color:#E9E9E9;text-align:left;vertical-align:top;" |Party
! style="background-color:#E9E9E9;text-align:right;" |Votes
! style="background-color:#E9E9E9;text-align:right;" |%
|-
|style="background-color:"|
|align=left|Oleg Mikhailov
|align=left|Communist Party
|81,407
|32.36%
|-
|style="background-color:"|
|align=left|Olga Savastyanova
|align=left|United Russia
|67,531
|26.84%
|-
|style="background-color:"|
|align=left|Tatyana Saladina
|align=left|A Just Russia — For Truth
|23,257
|9.24%
|-
|style="background-color:"|
|align=left|Andrey Nikitin
|align=left|Liberal Democratic Party
|21,186
|8.42%
|-
|style="background-color:"|
|align=left|Viktor Filipchuk
|align=left|New People
|19,060
|7.58%
|-
|style="background-color:"|
|align=left|Ivan Ruban
|align=left|Communists of Russia
|16,926
|6.73%
|-
|style="background-color:"|
|align=left|Viktor Betekhtin
|align=left|Green Alternative
|9,105
|3.62%
|-
| colspan="5" style="background-color:#E9E9E9;"|
|- style="font-weight:bold"
| colspan="3" style="text-align:left;" | Total
| 251,579
| 100%
|-
| colspan="5" style="background-color:#E9E9E9;"|
|- style="font-weight:bold"
| colspan="4" |Source:
|
|}

Notes

Sources
18. Сыктывкарский одномандатный избирательный округ

References

Russian legislative constituencies
Politics of the Komi Republic